Anna Mikhailovna Avdeyeva (also known as Anna Avdeeva, born 6 April 1985 in Orenburg) is a Russian shot putter. She was fifth at the 2009 World Championships in Athletics and improved to fourth at the 2010 IAAF World Indoor Championships. Her personal best throw is 20.07 metres, achieved in July 2009 in Cheboksary.

She finished eighth at the 2002 World Junior Championships, won the silver medal at the 2004 World Junior Championships and finished eighth at the 2005 Summer Universiade. She also competed at the 2007 World Championships without reaching the finals.

Avdeyeva failed an out-of-competition doping test in July 2013 and was given a two-year ban from competitive athletics.

International competitions

National titles
Russian Athletics Championships
Shot put: 2009, 2010, 2017

See also
List of doping cases in athletics
List of IAAF World Indoor Championships medalists (women)
List of European Athletics Championships medalists (women)
List of stripped European Athletics Championships medals
List of European Athletics Indoor Championships medalists

References

1985 births
Living people
People from Orenburg
Sportspeople from Orenburg Oblast
Russian female shot putters
Olympic female shot putters
Olympic athletes of Russia
Athletes (track and field) at the 2012 Summer Olympics
World Athletics Championships athletes for Russia
World Athletics Indoor Championships medalists
European Athletics Championships winners
European Athletics Championships medalists
European Athletics Indoor Championships winners
Russian Athletics Championships winners
Doping cases in athletics
Russian sportspeople in doping cases
20th-century Russian women
21st-century Russian women